James Kevin Smith (born September 25, 1960) is a former American football running back in the National Football League for the Los Angeles Raiders, the Washington Redskins, and the Minnesota Vikings.  He played high school football in Kankakee, Illinois at Westview High School there before the merging of Westview and Eastridge High.

Smith played college football at Purdue for three seasons (1979–81) before transferring to Elon College for the remainder of his collegiate career and was drafted in the fourth round of the 1984 NFL Draft. In 1978, Smith was named All-State player of the year in the state of Illinois.   He briefly played with the Green Bay Packers.

At Purdue, Smith totaled 1,466 yards and 15 TDs on 360 carries.  He was a member of Purdue's 1979 Bluebonnet Bowl and 1980 Liberty Bowl championship teams.

References

External links 
NFL.com player page

1960 births
Living people
Sportspeople from Kankakee, Illinois
American football running backs
Purdue Boilermakers football players
Elon Phoenix football players
Los Angeles Raiders players
Washington Redskins players
Minnesota Vikings players
National Football League replacement players